

The 1952 Transportes Aéreos Nacional Douglas C-47 mid-air fire occurred on 12 August 1952 when a Douglas C-47A registered PP-ANH was destroyed after a in-flight fire caused it to crash near Palmeiras de Goiás, Brazil.

The 1944-built C-47 was on a domestic flight from Rio Verde Airport to Goiânia-Santa Genoveva Airport, belonged to Viabras and was operated by Transportes Aéreos Nacional.

References
Citations

Bibliography

Accidents and incidents involving the Douglas C-47 Skytrain
Airliner accidents and incidents caused by in-flight fires
Aviation accidents and incidents in 1952
Aviation accidents and incidents in Brazil
Transportes Aéreos Nacional accidents and incidents
1952 in Brazil
August 1952 events in South America